Al-Mu'jam as-Saghir, is one of the Hadith book written by great Hadith Narrator and compiler Imam Al-Tabarani (874–971 CE, 260–360 AH). It is part of his Hadith book series by name of Mu'ajim Al-Tabarani. The other two books of the series are Al-Mu'jam al-Awsat & Al-Mu'jam al-Kabeer.

Description
This book contains almost 1200 hadiths according to Maktaba Shamila. It is the smallest book of Imam's Mu'jam Series. The book contains Sahih (authentic), Da'if (weak) and Maud'o (fabricated) narrations. The book is mostly famous among the scholars only. Imam  Ali ibn Abu Bakr al-Haythami, quoted Hadiths from Al-Mu'jam as-Saghir in his famous book Majma al-Zawa'id.

Publications
The book has been published in various languages by many organizations around the world: 
   Unwan al- unwan aw al-mu jam al-saghir, Published: Dar al-Kutub (2003)
    Mu‘jam al-ṣaghīr, Published: Jiddah : N.H.al-D.al-Barakātī, 2007.

See also
 List of Sunni books
 Kutub al-Sittah
 Sahih Muslim
 Jami al-Tirmidhi
 Sunan Abu Dawood
 Jami' at-Tirmidhi
 Either: Sunan ibn Majah, Muwatta Malik

References

9th-century Arabic books
10th-century Arabic books
Sunni literature
Hadith
Hadith collections
Sunni hadith collections